Tyrone is a male given name of Irish origin. The name originates from the toponym County Tyrone in Northern Ireland, which in turn derives from the Irish language Tír Eoghain ("land of Eoghan"). Tír Eoghain was the name of a Gaelic kingdom of Medieval Ireland. Eoghan is variant of Eógan and Owen, or the Scottish Ewan. The name was popularised by American actor Tyrone Power (1914–1958), who descended from a long Irish theatrical line going back to his great-grandfather, the Irish actor and comedian Tyrone Power (1797–1841). In the United States, the name has become increasingly popular due to use by members of the African American community.

People

Given name

Tyrone (producer) (born 1986), Nigerian producer
Tyrone Berry (born 1987), English footballer
Tyrone Braxton (born 1964), American football player
Tyrone Brunson (musician) (1956–2013), American singer
Tyrone Mings (born 1993), English footballer
Tyrone Bogues (born 1965), American professional basketball player
Tyrone Corbin (born 1962), former basketball player
Tyrone Davis (disambiguation), multiple people
Tyrone Garner (disambiguation), multiple people
Tyrone William Griffin Jr. or Ty Dolla Sign (born 1985), American singer
Tyrone Guthrie (1900–1971), Anglo-Irish theatrical director
Tyrone Hayes (born 1967), American biologist and professor 
Tyrone Howe (born 1971), Irish rugby union player
Tyrone Marshall (born 1974), Jamaican footballer
Tyrone O'Sullivan (born c. 1945), Welsh trade unionist
Tyrone Peachey (born 1991), Australian Rugby League player
Tyrone Power (Irish actor) (1795–1841), Irish stage actor, comedian, author and theatrical manager
Tyrone Power (1914–1958), American actor
Tyrone Power Jr. (born 1959), American actor
Tyrone Power Sr. (1869–1931), Anglo-American actor
W. Tyrone Power (1819–1911), Australian artist
Tyrone Savage (born 1985), Canadian actor
Tyrone Wheatley (born 1972), American football player
Tyrone Wheatley Jr. (born 1997), American football player
Tyrone Williams (disambiguation), multiple people
Tyrone S. Woods (1971–2012), U.S. Navy SEAL killed in the 2012 Benghazi attack

Middle name
Dana Tyrone Rohrabacher (born 1947), American politician
Dwyane Tyrone Wade (born 1982), American basketball player
Michael Tyrone Ellis (born 1967), British politician
Stephen Tyrone Colbert (born 1964), American satirist and host of The Late Show with Stephen Colbert

Fictional characters
Tyrone Biggums, a recurring character on Chappelle's Show
Tyrone Slothrop, character in Thomas Pynchon's novel Gravity's Rainbow
Tyrone Dobbs, a character on Coronation Street
 Dr. Tyrone C. Berger, a character in Judith Guest's 1976 novel Ordinary People and the 1980 film adaptation of the same name
 Tyrone, a character from The Backyardigans
 Tyrone, or T, a character from Trailer Park Boys
 Tyrone, a character in Snatch
 Tyrone, a character in the cartoon series Baggy Pants and the Nitwits
 James, Linda, Jamie, and Edmund Tyrone, characters in Eugene O'Neill's play Long Day's Journey into Night
 Count Tyrone Rugen, a character from The Princess Bride

References

External links
 
 

Irish masculine given names
African-American given names